Montazzoli is a comune and town in the Province of Chieti in the Abruzzo region of Italy

See also
Castello Franceschelli

References

 
Cities and towns in Abruzzo